{{DISPLAYTITLE:Tau7 Serpentis}}

Tau7 Serpentis, Latinized from τ7 Serpentis, is an A-type star in the constellation of Serpens,  approximately 174 light-years from the Earth.  It has an apparent visual magnitude of approximately 5.804.

References

Serpens (constellation)
A-type main-sequence stars
Serpentis, 22
Serpentis, Tau7
140232
076878
BD+18 3059
5845